Karine Deshayes (born 25 January 1973) is a French mezzo-soprano.

Biography
Deshayes was born in Rueil-Malmaison. She studied musicology at the Sorbonne, then singing with Mireille Alcantara at the Conservatoire de Paris, in which she later also specialized in baroque music under Emmanuelle Haïm. She also attended masterclasses of her mentor Régine Crespin. In 1998 she joined the troupe of Opéra National de Lyon. In 2001, she won several prizes in the "Voix d'Or" competition, and first prize in the "Voix Nouvelles" competition in 2002.

In October 2006 she made her New York Metropolitan Opera debut with Siébel in Gounod's Faust.

In February 2011, she debuted in the role of Urbain in Les Huguenots at the Teatro Real in Madrid.

In 2014 she made her San Francisco Opera debut in La Cenerentola.

Awards and honours
 Singer of the Year (Artiste lyrique de l'année) in the Victoires de la musique classique (2011, 2016, 2020)
 2019: Officier of the Ordre des Arts et des Lettres

Selected discography

Recital
 Fauré: Le jardin clos, La chanson d'Ève, Mélodies. with Hélène Lucas, Stéphane Degout. Zig-Zag Territoires, 2009
 Après un rêve. with Ensemble Contraste. Aparté, 2015
 Rossini. with Les Forces Majeures, Raphael Merlin. Aparté, 2016

Full work recording
 Rameau: Le Berger Fidèle, Thétis & Pièces en concerts. with Alain Buet, Benjamin Lazar, Les Musiciens de Monsieur Croche. Alpha, 2004
 Porpora: Leçons de ténèbres. with Les Paladins, Jérôme Correas. Arion, 2005
 Magnificat (Bach), Dixit Dominus (Handel). with Dessay, Jaroussky, Spence, Naouri. Emmanuelle Haïm, Le Concert d'Astrée. Erato, 2007
 Karol Beffa: Into the Dark. with Ensemble Contraste, Johan Farjot, Arnaud Thorette, Karol Beffa, Emmanuel Ceysson. Aparté, 2015
 Stabat Mater (Pergolesi). with Sonya Yoncheva, Ensemble Amarillis. Sony, 2016

Collaboration 
 Fauré: La bonne chanson Op.61 & Piano Quartet Op.15, with Ensemble Contraste, Geneviève Laurenceau. Zig-Zag Territoires, 2010
 Cantates romantiques françaises. with Opera Fuoco, David Stern. Palazzetto Bru Zane, 2013
 Henri Marteau: Complete Works for String Quartet I. with Isasi Quartet. cpo, 2018

References

External links
 

1973 births
Living people
Singers from Paris
French operatic mezzo-sopranos
Conservatoire de Paris alumni
University of Paris alumni
Officiers of the Ordre des Arts et des Lettres
21st-century French women opera singers

People from Hauts-de-Seine